Mount Moriya is the rounded, ice-covered peak rising to 1634 m in Lovech Heights on Nordenskjöld Coast in Graham Land, Antarctica.  It is surmounting Rogosh Glacier to the south and northwest, Zlokuchene Glacier to the east-northeast, and Risimina Glacier to the southeast.

The feature is named after the medieval fortress of Moriya in western Bulgaria.

Location
British mapping in 1978.

Maps
 Antarctic Digital Database (ADD). Scale 1:250000 topographic map of Antarctica. Scientific Committee on Antarctic Research (SCAR). Since 1993, regularly upgraded and updated.

Notes

References
 Mount Moriya. SCAR Composite Antarctic Gazetteer.
 Bulgarian Antarctic Gazetteer. Antarctic Place-names Commission. (details in Bulgarian, basic data in English)

External links
 Mount Moriya. Copernix satellite image

Moriya
Nordenskjöld Coast
Bulgaria and the Antarctic